This is a list of cases reported in volume 261 of United States Reports, decided by the Supreme Court of the United States in 1923.

Justices of the Supreme Court at the time of volume 261 U.S. 

The Supreme Court is established by Article III, Section 1 of the Constitution of the United States, which says: "The judicial Power of the United States, shall be vested in one supreme Court . . .". The size of the Court is not specified; the Constitution leaves it to Congress to set the number of justices. Under the Judiciary Act of 1789 Congress originally fixed the number of justices at six (one chief justice and five associate justices). Since 1789 Congress has varied the size of the Court from six to seven, nine, ten, and back to nine justices (always including one chief justice).

When the cases in volume 261 were decided the Court comprised the following nine members:

Notable cases in 261 U.S.

Moore v. Dempsey
In Moore v. Dempsey, 261 U.S. 86 (1923), the Supreme Court held that the African-American defendants' mob-dominated trials deprived them of due process guaranteed by the Due Process Clause of the Fourteenth Amendment. It reversed the U.S. district court's decision declining the petitioners' writ of habeas corpus. This case was a precedent for the Supreme Court's review of state criminal trials in terms of their compliance with the Bill of Rights. Moore is a significant precedent for wider use of federal writs of habeas corpus to review state court convictions that occurred under conditions abridging federal constitutional rights. It marked the beginning of stricter scrutiny by the Supreme Court of state criminal trials in terms of their compliance with the Bill of Rights. This ruling reduced the capacity of a local community "to permanently deprive or deny the rights of those who might be prosecuted in its courts."

United States v. Thind
United States v. Thind, 261 U.S. 204 (1923), is a Supreme Court decision that Bhagat Singh Thind, an Indian Sikh man who identified himself as an Aryan, was ineligible for naturalized citizenship in the United States. Thind had filed a petition for naturalization under the Naturalization Act of 1906 which allowed only "free white persons" and "aliens of African nativity and persons of African descent" to become United States citizens by naturalization. After his petition was granted, government attorneys initiated a proceeding to cancel Thind's naturalization. Thind did not challenge the constitutionality of the racial restrictions. Instead, he attempted to be classified as a "free white person" within the meaning of the Naturalization Act based on the fact that Indians and Europeans share common descent from Proto-Indo-Europeans. The Supreme Court rejected Thind's argument, adding that Thind did not meet a "common sense" definition of white. The Court concluded that "the term 'Aryan' has to do with linguistic, and not with physical characteristics.

Adkins v. Children's Hospital
In Adkins v. Children's Hospital, 261 U.S. 525 (1923), the Supreme Court ruled that federal minimum wage legislation for women was an unconstitutional infringement of liberty of contract, as protected by the due process clause of the Fifth Amendment. Adkins was eventually overturned in the 1937 decision West Coast Hotel Co. v. Parrish.

Citation style 

Under the Judiciary Act of 1789 the federal court structure at the time comprised District Courts, which had general trial jurisdiction; Circuit Courts, which had mixed trial and appellate (from the US District Courts) jurisdiction; and the United States Supreme Court, which had appellate jurisdiction over the federal District and Circuit courts—and for certain issues over state courts. The Supreme Court also had limited original jurisdiction (i.e., in which cases could be filed directly with the Supreme Court without first having been heard by a lower federal or state court). There were one or more federal District Courts and/or Circuit Courts in each state, territory, or other geographical region.

The Judiciary Act of 1891 created the United States Courts of Appeals and reassigned the jurisdiction of most routine appeals from the district and circuit courts to these appellate courts. The Act created nine new courts that were originally known as the "United States Circuit Courts of Appeals." The new courts had jurisdiction over most appeals of lower court decisions. The Supreme Court could review either legal issues that a court of appeals certified or decisions of court of appeals by writ of certiorari. On January 1, 1912, the effective date of the Judicial Code of 1911, the old Circuit Courts were abolished, with their remaining trial court jurisdiction transferred to the U.S. District Courts.

Bluebook citation style is used for case names, citations, and jurisdictions.
 "# Cir." = United States Court of Appeals
 e.g., "3d Cir." = United States Court of Appeals for the Third Circuit
 e.g.,"D. Mass." = United States District Court for the District of Massachusetts
 "E." = Eastern; "M." = Middle; "N." = Northern; "S." = Southern; "W." = Western
 e.g.,"M.D. Ala." = United States District Court for the Middle District of Alabama
 "Ct. Cl." = United States Court of Claims
 The abbreviation of a state's name alone indicates the highest appellate court in that state's judiciary at the time.
 e.g.,"Pa." = Supreme Court of Pennsylvania
 e.g.,"Me." = Supreme Judicial Court of Maine

List of cases in volume 261 U.S.

Notes and references

External links
  Case reports in volume 261 from Library of Congress
  Case reports in volume 261 from Court Listener
  Case reports in volume 261 from the Caselaw Access Project of Harvard Law School
  Case reports in volume 261 from Google Scholar
  Case reports in volume 261 from Justia
  Case reports in volume 261 from Open Jurist
 Website of the United States Supreme Court
 United States Courts website about the Supreme Court
 National Archives, Records of the Supreme Court of the United States
 American Bar Association, How Does the Supreme Court Work?
 The Supreme Court Historical Society